Quest 1 is a single-player role-playing game originally written for the TRS-80 and translated for the Apple II and Atari 8-bit family. Published by SoftSide Magazine in 1981 as a type-in program, it is the first-known published game by Brian Reynolds. Quest 1 was republished in The Best of SoftSide (1983) and released on accompanying 5¼-inch floppy disks.

References

External links
 Quest 1 at Atari Mania

1981 video games
Apple II games
Atari 8-bit family games
Role-playing video games
SoftSide games
TRS-80 games
Video games developed in the United States
Commercial video games with freely available source code